Daniel J. Fox is an American Politician currently serving as a State Representative from the 148th District, which encompasses the East Side of Stamford, Connecticut, in the Connecticut House of Representatives since 2011. Fox was first elected in 2011 in a special election in order to replace Carlo Leone. Fox was re-elected in 2012, 2014, 2016, 2018, and 2020. Fox currently serves as the assistant Majority Whip of the House and also serves on the House Judiciary committee.

References

Members of the Connecticut House of Representatives
People from Stamford, Connecticut
Year of birth missing (living people)
Living people